Sydney Eloise and the Palms are an American indie pop band from Atlanta, Georgia.

History
Sydney Eloise and the Palms began in 2015 with the release of their debut full-length album titled Faces.

Discography
Studio albums
Faces (2015, The Cottage Recording Company and Bear Kit Recordings)

References

Indie pop groups from Georgia (U.S. state)